Schizothorax microstomus is a species of ray-finned fish in the genus Schizothorax from Lugu Lake, Ninglang, Yunnan.

References 

Schizothorax
Fish described in 1982